Pednathise Head is a skerry that is the southernmost point of England, the United Kingdom, and the British Isles if the Channel Islands are excluded. It is part of the Western Rocks group of the Isles of Scilly, southwest of Cornwall.

Uninhabited islands of the Isles of Scilly